Westia is a genus of moths in the family Psychidae. It was described by David Stephen Fletcher in 1982.

Species
Westia cyrtozona (West, 1932)
Westia nigrobasalis Sobczyk, 2009
Westia permagna Sobczyk, 2009

References

  2009: Beiträge zur Kenntnis der orientalischen Psychidae (Lepidoptera) II. Revision der Degia-Gattungsgruppe sowie der Gattung Westia (Typhoniinae Lederer, 1853) mit der Beschreibung neuer Gattungen und Arten. Entomofauna 30: 365–436. Full article: .
 , 2011: World Catalogue of Insects Volume 10 Psychidae (Lepidoptera): 1–467.

External links

Psychidae
Psychidae genera